Ashot or Ashod is an Armenian given name. Notable persons with that surname include:

Kings of the Bagratuni Dynasty
Ashot Msaker (Ashot the Carnivorous) (died 826)
Ashot I of Armenia (Ashot the Great), ruled 884-890
Ashot II, Ashot Yerkat (Ashot the Iron), 915-930
Ashot III, Voghormats (Ashot the Merciful) 953-977
Ashot IV, Qadj (Ashot the Brave), 1021-1039/1040

Kings of Tao-Klarjeti
Ashot I of Iberia (Ashot I Kuropalates) (died 830), King of Tao-Klarjeti
Ashot II of Tao Kuropalates, King of Tao-Klarjeti 937-954
Ashot the Immature (Kukhi), Eristavt Eristavi (died 918), King of Tao-Klarjeti

Kings of Vaspurakan
 Ashot-Sahak of Vaspurakan
 Derenik-Ashot of Vaspurakan

Other people
Ashot ibn Shavur, Shaddadid ruler of Arran in 1068–69
Ashot Yegisaryan (born 1965), deputy of the State Duma of Russia
Ashot Danielyan (born 1974), Armenian weightlifter
Ashot Khachatryan (born 1959), Armenian football defender
Ashot Anastasian (born 1964), Armenian chess grandmaster
Ashot Melikjanyan (1952–2001), Soviet Armenian actor
Ashot Nadanian (born 1972), Armenian chess player
Ashot Navasardyan (1950–1997), Armenian politician, founder of the Republican Party of Armenia
Ashot Zorian (1905–1970), Turkish-born Egyptian painter and educator of Armenian ethnicity

References 

Armenian masculine given names